This is a list of current and former Roman Catholic churches in the Roman Catholic Diocese of Saginaw. The archdiocese is located in Central Michigan and The Thumb and includes the cities of Bay City, Midland, and Saginaw, and 11 counties.

The cathedral church of the diocese is the Cathedral of Mary of the Assumption, built from 1901 to 1903 in Saginaw.

Bay County

Saginaw County

North Diocese

Thumb Region

West Diocese

References

 
Saginaw